Sebők is a Hungarian surname.

People
 Balázs Sebők (born 1994), Hungarian ice hockey player
 György Sebők (1922-1999), Hungarian-born American pianist and academic
 Joe Sebok (born 1977), American poker player 
 József Sebők (born 1975), Hungarian football player
 Lilly Dubowitz (1930-2016), Hungarian-born British paediatrician, born Lilly Sebők
 Margit Sebők (1939–2000), Hungarian painter and educator
 Sándor Sebők, Hungarian sailor 
 Thomas Sebeok (1920-2001), Hungarian-born American semiotician and linguist, born Sebők
 Vilmos Sebők (born 1973), Hungarian football player
 Zsolt Sebők (born 1979), Hungarian football player

Hungarian-language surnames
Surnames